Hurricane Hortense was the first tropical cyclone to make landfall in Guadeloupe and Puerto Rico since Hurricane Hugo in 1989, and the second most intense hurricane during the 1996 Atlantic hurricane season. The eighth tropical cyclone, eighth named storm, and sixth hurricane of the season. Hortense developed on September 3 from a tropical wave in the central Atlantic Ocean. Initially a tropical depression, it headed westward without significant strengthening for four days due to unfavorable upper-level winds. While nearing the Lesser Antilles upper-level winds decreased, allowing the depression to become Tropical Storm Hortense on September 7. Hortense crossed Guadeloupe on September 8 and entered the Caribbean Sea. By on the following day, it was upgraded to a hurricane while curving northwestward. Hortense made landfall in Puerto Rico on September 9 and brushed the Dominican Republic shortly thereafter. After re-entering the Atlantic, Hortense began to substantially strengthen and peaked as a 140 mph (220 km/h) Category 4 hurricane early on September 13. Thereafter, the storm steadily weakened as it tracked rapidly north-northeastward. Early on September 15, Hortense made landfall in Nova Scotia as a minimal Category 1 hurricane. It quickly weakened further to a tropical storm before re-entering the Atlantic to the south of Newfoundland. Late on September 15, Hortense transitioned into an extratropical cyclone and subsequently merged with a frontal system about 24 hours later.

The storm produced heavy rainfall and gusty winds as it passed through the Lesser Antilles. On Guadeloupe, damage was most significant to crops, with over 50% of banana plantains destroyed. Localized flooding was reported on Martinique. Impact was most significant in Puerto Rico. Across the island, 11,463 houses were severely damaged. About 1.4 million people on Puerto Rico were left without electricity – equivalent to about 40% of the island's population. Damage in Puerto Rico was estimated at $153.4 million (1996 USD). There were also 19 deaths, most of which due to drowning during flash floods. In the Dominican Republic, strong winds damaged a number of buildings and houses, and downed several power lines. Flooding also forced the closure of several roads and impacted 80% of crops in Samaná Province. At least three fatalities were confirmed in that country. The storm brought strong winds to the Bahamas and Turks and Caicos Islands, and lesser winds to Bermuda. Later in its duration, Hortense struck Nova Scotia, bringing heavy rainfall and hurricane-force winds to isolated locations. There were many power outages, trees blown down, roofs torn away, and roads damaged in the Province. New Brunswick, Newfoundland, and Prince Edward Island were also impacted, though not as severely as in Nova Scotia. Damage in Atlantic Canada reached approximately $3.64 million.

Meteorological history

A tropical wave and a broad low-pressure area associated with it exited the west coast of Africa near Dakar, Senegal on August 30. Although deep convection was minimal on satellite imagery, the system possessed a well-defined low- to mid-level circulation. After crossing several National Oceanic and Atmospheric Administration buoys early on September 3, it was determined that the system developed into Tropical Depression Eight at 1200 UTC on that same day, while located about halfway between Cape Verde and the Lesser Antilles. Under the influence of strong high pressure ridge, the depression tracked almost due westward, without significant intensification. Convection remained sporadic and disorganized, with a reconnaissance flight finding a board circulation and a few squall on September 6. While nearing the Leeward Islands, upper-level winds reduced to a favorable level, causing strengthening and allowing deep convection to increase.

At 0600 UTC on September 7, the depression had intensified into Tropical Storm Hortense. Early on September 8, Hortense struck Guadeloupe with winds of 60 mph (95 km/h). Shortly thereafter, intensification slowed, due to increased vertical wind shear by upper-level short wave in the eastern Caribbean Sea. Convection diminished, with satellite imagery showing a tropical cyclone with the low-level circulation exposed. The short-wave soon left the area, causing wind shear to decrease and convection quickly re-developed.

By early on September 9, Hortense was upgraded to a hurricane, while curving northwestward. Around 0600 UTC on the following day, the storm made landfall near Guánica, Puerto Rico with winds of 80 mph (130 km/h); this made it the first hurricane landfall on the island since Hurricane Hugo in 1989. Initially, most tropical cyclone forecast models anticipated Hortense would pass south of the island and instead strike the Dominican Republic. After two hours, Hortense emerged into the Mona Passage and brushed the eastern tip of Dominican Republic; Punta Cana near the eastern tip of the country reported the calm of the eye on September 10. Land interaction with Hispaniola weakened the storm slightly, though it would soon re-strengthen.

While tracking east of Turks and Caicos Islands on September 11, Hortense became a Category 2 hurricane and then to a Category 3 hurricane by early on the following day. Continuing to intensify, Hortense reached Category 4 intensity on September 12. Around that time, a developing trough centered over the Eastern United States caused the storm to curve almost due northward and accelerate.

After maintaining Category 4 intensity for 24 hours, the storm weakened back to a Category 3 hurricane. While passing well west of Bermuda, Hortense was downgraded to a Category 2 hurricane early on September 14. Later that day, the storm weakened further to a Category 1 hurricane. Early on September 15, Hortense made its final landfall near West Quoddy, Nova Scotia with winds of 75 mph (120 km/h). Hortense weakened over Nova Scotia and was a tropical storm when it re-emerged into the Atlantic less than nine hours after landfall. By 1800 UTC on September 15, Hortense transitioned into an extratropical cyclone while just south of Newfoundland. The storm's remnants merged with a frontal system on the following day.

Preparations
Shortly after Hortense intensified into a tropical storm, a tropical storm warning was issued by the respective governments from Martinique to the United States Virgin Islands. Late on September 7, about 57 hours before the hurricane's Puerto Rico landfall, a tropical storm warning and hurricane watch was issued for Puerto Rico; however, the watch was discontinued at 1500 UTC on September 8 after the storm experienced increased wind shear in the region. At the same time, a hurricane warning was left after having been issued for the British and United States Virgin Islands 12 hours earlier. At 1500 UTC on September 9 – about fifteen hours before landfall – a hurricane warning was issued in Puerto Rico. The downgrade of the warning on the island led residents to underestimate the hurricane's threat. Before Hortense struck Puerto Rico, the local National Weather Service office warned of the potential of rainfall exceeding , with higher totals in the mountains.

Late on September 9, a hurricane warning was issued for portions of eastern Dominican Republic, which was eventually extended along the country's northern coastline. A tropical storm warning and hurricane watch was issued for the north coast of Haiti to St. Nicolas. On September 10, a hurricane warning was issued for the Turks and Caicos Islands and for the Bahamas islands of Inagua and Mayaguana; a hurricane watch was also issued for the Central Bahamas.

Impact

Lesser Antilles
While still a tropical storm, Hortense moved through the Lesser Antilles with significant amounts of precipitation. La Désirade observed 81 mph (130 km/h) wind gusts and sustained winds of  while Pointe-à-Pitre International Airport observed 58 mph (90 km/h) wind gusts. The storm caused significant crop damage, destroying roughly over 50 percent of the banana plantain. Further south, heavy rains led to scattered flooding in Martinique, which inundated streets, while strong winds knocked down power lines. One man who attempted to drive across a flooded road was rescued from his vehicle seconds before it was swept away.

The rains flooded low-lying areas of Frederiksted. On nearby Saint Thomas, the storm dropped  of rainfall, with gusts reaching only .

Greater Antilles

As Hortense approached Puerto Rico, the eastern half of the circulation had a concentrated area of thunderstorms. Totals ranged from below  near where the storm moved ashore to a peak of  near Cayey. The rainfall caused widespread flash flooding and increased river discharge; a station along the Río Grande de Loíza in San Lorenzo reported a 1 in 100 year flow rate. Rivers and creeks across the region reached high peaks, and there were several reports of mudslides. Along the southern Puerto Rico coast, Hortense caused coastal flooding and beach erosion.

An overflown river near San Juan flooded several homes. Across the island, Hortense left about 1.3 million people without power and 1.1 million customers without water. During the storm, 10,563 people evacuated to storm shelters. Across the island, 11,463 houses were severely damaged by Hortense. The hurricane left $128.4 million in crop damage, primarily to coffee, plantains, and bananas. There was another $25 million from road damage. There were 19 deaths on the island, many of whom due to flash flood drownings. Some 1,400,000 people, about 40% of the population, lost power during and after the storm, straining the cleanup effort in the following days and weeks with lack of air conditioning and spoiled food.

Puerto Plata along the northern coast also reported hurricane-force winds. High winds destroyed a school and church, damaged several houses, and downed several power lines. While passing the region, the hurricane produced a  storm surge. The combination of the surge and heavy rainfall produced flooding that closed roadways. Hortense damaged 80% of the crops in Samaná. In the country, the hurricane killed three people and left 21 missing.

Elsewhere

The Bahamas, threatened by their second major hurricane in two weeks, fared well from the storm, with little damage and no casualties.

The storm also brought rainfall to the island, though total amounts are unknown.

In Nova Scotia, Hortense dropped heavy rainfall and caused strong winds, causing power outages, uprooted trees, and moderate structural damage amounting to $3 million (1996 USD). Rainfall was light on Prince Edward Island, with the highest observed being  in Charlottetown. Strong winds were reported throughout the province. Gusts reached  in Charlottetown and  elsewhere. The winds downed power lines, leaving numerous residents without electricity, especially in Charlottetown, East Point, Montague, Murray River, Souris.

Aftermath

On September 11, President Bill Clinton declared a major disaster in 68 of the 78 municipalities of Puerto Rico; this allowed federal funding for debris removal, repairing public roads and buildings and assistance to individually affected residents.

The name Hortense was retired in the spring of 1997 following this storm, and will not be used again in this basin. It was replaced with Hanna in the 2002 season.

See also

 Other storms of the same name
 List of retired Atlantic hurricane names
 Hurricane Marilyn (1995)
 Hurricane Gonzalo (2014)
 Hurricane Maria (2017)
 Hurricane Fiona (2022)

References

External links
 NHC Hortense Report
 Stormcarib.com Hortense Information
 Hurricane Hortense Info

1996 Atlantic hurricane season
Hortense
Category 4 Atlantic hurricanes
Hurricanes in the Leeward Islands
Hurricanes in Guadeloupe
Hurricanes in Îles des Saintes
Hurricanes in Dominica
Hurricanes in the United States Virgin Islands
Hurricanes in Puerto Rico
Hurricanes in the Bahamas
Hurricanes in Canada
Retired Atlantic hurricanes
1996 disasters in Canada
1996 in the Caribbean
1996 in Nova Scotia
1996 in Newfoundland and Labrador
September 1996 events